Fátima Verónica Ocampos (born 3 January 2003) is a Paraguayan handball player for Balonmano Base Oviedo and the Paraguay national team.

She was selected to represent Paraguay at the 2021 World Women's Handball Championship.

References

2003 births
Living people
Paraguayan female handball players
21st-century Paraguayan women